Mayall II, also known as NGC-224-G1, SKHB 1, GSC 2788:2139, HBK 0-1, M31GC J003247+393440 or Andromeda's Cluster, is a globular cluster orbiting M31, the Andromeda Galaxy.

Mayall II is considered to have twice the mass of Omega Centauri, and may contain a central, intermediate-mass (∼ 2 M⊙) black hole.

It was first identified as a possible globular cluster by American astronomers Nicholas Mayall and Olin J. Eggen in 1953 using a Palomar  Schmidt plate exposed in 1948.

Because of the widespread distribution of metallicity, indicating multiple star generations and a large stellar creation period, many contend that it is not a true globular cluster, but is actually the galactic core that remains of a dwarf galaxy consumed by Andromeda.

Origin of names

 Mayall II is named after Nicholas U. Mayall, who, with Olin J. Eggen, discovered it in 1953.
 SKHB 1 is named for Wallace L. W. Sargent, Charles T. Kowal, F. D. A. Hartwick and Sidney van den Bergh. They also named it G1 in 1977.
 HBK 0-1 is named for John Huchra, J. P. Brodie and S. M. Kent in 1991.

See also

 Messier 54
 Omega Centauri 
 Mayall's Object

References

External links
 Astrophysical Journal, Vol. 370, p. 495–504
 Publications of the Astronomical Society of the Pacific, Vol. 65, No. 382, p. 24–29
 Astronomical Journal, vol. 82, p. 947–953
 NightSkyInfo.com: Mayall II

Andromeda Galaxy
Globular clusters
Andromeda (constellation)